Nordfriesland – Dithmarschen Nord (English: North Frisia – Dithmarschen North) is an electoral constituency (German: Wahlkreis) represented in the Bundestag. It elects one member via first-past-the-post voting. Under the current constituency numbering system, it is designated as constituency 2. It is located in northwestern Schleswig-Holstein, comprising the Nordfriesland district and the northern part of the Dithmarschen district.

Nordfriesland – Dithmarschen Nord was created for the 1965 federal election. Since 2017, it has been represented by Astrid Damerow of the Christian Democratic Union (CDU).

Geography
Nordfriesland – Dithmarschen Nord is located in northwestern Schleswig-Holstein. As of the 2021 federal election, it comprises the district of Nordfriesland and the northern part of the Dithmarschen district, specifically the urban municipality of Heide and the Ämter of Büsum-Wesselburen, Eider, and Heider Umland.

History
Nordfriesland – Dithmarschen Nord was created in 1965, then known as Husum. It contained parts of the abolished constituencies of Husum – Südtondern – Eiderstedt and Norder- und Süderdithmarschen. Until 1972, it was constituency 3 in the numbering system. From 1972 until 2002, its name contained a hyphen between "Dithmarschen" and "Nord".

In the elections of 1965 and 1969, Husum consisted of the districts of Husum, Südtondern, Eiderstedt, and Norderdithmarschen. After reform of the administrative divisions in Schleswig-Holstein, the constituency acquired its current name and configuration, containing Nordfriesland and the northern part of Dithmarschen.

Members
The constituency has been held by the Christian Democratic Union (CDU) during all but two Bundestag terms since its creation in 1965. Its first representative was the CDU's Hermann Glüsing (1965–72), followed by Willi-Peter Sick (1972–80). It was won by the Social Democratic Party (SPD) in 1980, and represented by Wolfgang Rayer for a single term, before returning to the CDU in 1983. Between then and 1998, it was represented by future Minister-President of Schleswig-Holstein Peter Harry Carstensen. The constituency was won by the SPD's Manfred Opel in 1998, but again returned to the CDU in 2002, and was represented by Carstensen for another term. He was succeeded by Ingbert Liebing in 2005, who was in turn succeeded by Astrid Damerow in 2017. She was re-elected in 2021.

Election results

2021 election

2017 election

2013 election

2009 election

2005 election

References

Federal electoral districts in Schleswig-Holstein
Nordfriesland
Dithmarschen